Cathal Boylan  (Irish name: Cathal Ó Baoighealláin, born 30 April 1964) MLA has been a councillor on Armagh City and District Council since 2005. In March 2007 Cathal was elected as an MLA to the Northern Ireland Assembly to represent the Newry and Armagh constituency. He is currently the Sinn Féin Party Group Leader for Armagh Council and is a member of the Internal Scrutiny Committee, Public Services Scrutiny Committee, The Public Parks Scrutiny Committee and the Market Place Theatre Management Board. He is also Vice - chairperson of both the East Border Region Partnership and the Local Strategy Partnership (LSP).

He is a lifelong resident of Keady. He sits on the recently formed Keady Regeneration Committee, and for many years his membership of Keady Residents Association has involved his participation in discussions with the Parades Commission. The married man is the Chairperson of the local Mc Verry/McElvanna Sinn Féin Cumann, of which he was a founder member.

He was Chairperson of the Northern Ireland Assembly Environment committee between 2007 and 2011.

References

External links
Link to profile on Northern Ireland Assembly website

1964 births
Living people
People from Keady
Sinn Féin MLAs
Northern Ireland MLAs 2007–2011
Northern Ireland MLAs 2011–2016
Northern Ireland MLAs 2016–2017
Northern Ireland MLAs 2017–2022
Sinn Féin councillors in Northern Ireland
Members of Armagh City and District Council
Northern Ireland MLAs 2022–2027